The following is an episode list for the internet Star Trek fan audio drama series Starship Excelsior.

Season One: The Excelsior Returns (2007–08)

Season Two: Murder in the Blue Morgue (2008–09)

Season Three: The Sword of Damocles (2010–13)

Season Four: Ex Astris Mirificentia (2014–16)

Season Five: The Round Table (2017–21)

Season Six: The Odyssey (2021-)

Behind the Scenes with Starship Excelsior (2011-)

References

External links 
 Episode List (all seasons)

Star Trek: Excelsior
Unofficial works based on Star Trek
Fan films based on Star Trek
2007 audio plays
2008 audio plays
2009 audio plays
2010 audio plays
2011 audio plays
2012 audio plays
2013 audio plays